Crankworx is a four-stop tour of mountain biking competitions and races, the premier event of which is held each summer at Whistler-Blackcomb in Whistler, British Columbia at Whistler Mountain Bike Park.
 
The Crankworx core competitive events are downhill mountain biking, Slopestyle, Dual Slalom, and Pump Track. Other events unique to the festival include: Best Whip, Air DH & Kidsworx. 

Since its inception in 2004, Crankworx has become Whistler's largest annual festival. The event has evolved into the Crankworx World Tour with festivals in Rotorua, New Zealand, Cairns Australia and Innsbruck Austria. It has been called the Super Bowl of the sport and/or "The Ultimate experience in Mountain Biking", and is the biggest annual gathering of the mountain biking community.

Festival

A central aspect of Crankworx is a series of village-wide promotional displays and activities pertaining to extreme-style mountain biking. Many events happen throughout the week including demonstrations of bicycle tricks, music, and other entertainment. There is also a collection of manufacturers' booths, and the festival serves as a cycling industry gathering. Prominent display-type advertising, for a very wide variety of products, is present throughout all events. The festival has attracted sponsors including Bud Light, CLIF Bar, Monster Energy, Volkswagen, Dose.ca, SRAM Corporation, Norco, Giant Bicycles, Redbull, the Kona Bicycle Company, and various other corporate entities.

Competitions

The events held in 2009 were: Dual slalom, Monster Energy Garbonzo Downhill, Quon Memorial X/C Race, Womenzworx, Air Downhill, VW Trick Showdown, Giant Slalom, Kidsworx, Canadian Open Enduro, Trailsworx, Canadian Cheese Rolling Championships, Monster Energy Slopestyle, and the Canadian Open Downhill presented by Kona.

Crankworx Whistler Podiums

2022

2020 and 2021 cancelled

2019 Results

2018 Results

2017 Results

2016 Results

2015 Results

2014 Results

2013 Results

2012 Results

2011 Results

2010 Results

2009 Results

2008 Results

2007 Results

2006 Results

2005 Results

2004 Results

References

External links
 Official Crankworx website
 asilvertouch magazine article and photographs of Crankworx 2005
 Photo gallery in Bike magazine
 Article about Crankworks 2005 on dirtworld.com
 Article in NSMB magazine about the 2004 Slopestyle competition
 Article in NSMB magazine about the 2004 Garbanzo downhill competition

Mountain biking events in Canada
Mountain biking in British Columbia